The QF 3-inch 20 cwt anti-aircraft gun became the standard anti-aircraft gun used in the home defence of the United Kingdom against German Zeppelins airships and bombers and on the Western Front in World War I. It was also common on British warships in World War I and submarines in World War II. 20 cwt referred to the weight of the barrel and breech, to differentiate it from other 3-inch guns (1cwt = 1 hundredweight = , hence the barrel and breech together weighed ).

Design and development
The gun was based on a prewar Vickers naval  QF gun with modifications specified by the War Office in 1914. These (Mk I) included the introduction of a vertical sliding breech-block to allow semi-automatic operation. When the gun recoiled and ran forward after firing, the motion also opened the breech, ejected the empty cartridge case and held the breech open ready to reload, with the striker cocked. When the gunner loaded the next round, the block closed and the gun fired.

The early  shrapnel shell at  caused excessive barrel wear and was unstable in flight. The 1916  shell at  proved ballistically superior and was better suited to a high explosive filling.

The Mark I* had different rifling. The Mark II lost the semi-automatic action.
The Mk III of 1916 reverted to a 2-motion screw breech to suit available manufacturing capability, and Mk IV had a single-tube barrel and single-motion screw breech; a Welin breech block with an Asbury breech.

A US Army report on anti-aircraft guns of April 1917 reported that this gun's semi-automatic loading system was discontinued because of difficulties of operation at higher angles of elevation, and replaced by "the standard Vickers-type straight-pull breech mechanism", reducing rate of fire from 22 to 20 rds/minute. Routledge quotes a rate of fire of 16–18 rounds per minute, in the context of the 16-pounder shell of 1916. This would appear to be the effective rate of fire found to be sustainable in action.

Beginning in 1930, a new towed 4-wheeled sprung trailer platform was introduced to replace the obsolete lorries still used as mounts from World War I, together with modern new barrels, and equipment to connect the guns to the new Vickers No. 1 Predictor.
Eight more Mks followed between the World Wars. By 1934 the rocking-bar deflection sights had been replaced by Magslip receiver dials which received input from the Predictor, with the layers matching pointers instead of tracking the target. Predictor No. 1 was supplemented from 1937 by Predictor No. 2, based on a US Sperry AAA Computer M3A3.

The 3-inch 20 cwt gun was superseded by the QF  AA gun from 1938 onwards, but numbers of various Marks remained in service throughout World War II. In Naval use it was being replaced in the 1920s by the QF  Mk V on HA (high-angle) mounting.

Combat use

World War I
Britain entered World War I with no anti-aircraft artillery. When war broke out and Germany occupied Belgium and North-east France, it was realised that key installations in England could be attacked by air. As a result, a search for suitable anti-aircraft guns began. The Navy provided the initial  guns from its warships, approximately 18 by December 1914, for the defence of key installations in Britain, manned by RNVR crews, until the new specialised anti-aircraft version began production and entered service. It was from then onwards operated by Royal Garrison Artillery crews, with drivers and crew for motor lorries provided by the Army Service Corps. However, the Mobile Anti-Aircraft Brigade based at Kenwood Barracks in London, continued to be manned by the RNVR, although under the operational control of the Army.

Other earlier anti-aircraft guns based on the existing 13-pounder and 18-pounder guns proved inadequate, apart from the QF 13-pounder 9 cwt but even that could not reach high altitudes and fired a fairly light shell. The 3-inch 20 cwt with its powerful and stable in flight,  shell and fairly high altitude was well suited to defending the United Kingdom against high-altitude Zeppelins and bombers. The 16-pound shell took 9.2 seconds to reach  at 25 degrees from horizontal, 13.7 seconds to reach  at 40 degrees, 18.8 seconds to reach  at 55 degrees. This means that the gun team had to calculate where the target would be 9 to 18 seconds ahead, determine the deflection and set the correct fuze length, load, aim and fire accordingly. Deflection was calculated mechanically and graphically using an optical height & rangefinder to provide data for the two piece Wilson-Dalby 'predictor', with the fuze length read off a scale mounted on the gun.

British time fuzes, required for airburst shooting, were powder burning (igniferous). However, the powder burning rate changed as air pressure reduced, making them erratic for the new vertical shooting. Modified fuzes reduced the variability but did not cure the problem. Britain lagged behind Germany in developing clockwork time fuzes. In addition, experience showed that the percussion mechanism in time fuzes, which burst the shrapnel shell on impact if the timer failed, had to be removed because AA shells could land among friendly troops and nearby civilians. Igniferous fuzes had to have a gaine in order to detonate HE shells.

The carriage's short recoil of  allowed a higher rate of fire than for AA guns based on long-recoil field guns such as the QF 13-pounder 9 cwt.

By June 1916, 202 3-inch 20 cwt were deployed in the air defence of Britain, of a total of 371 AA guns.

The first guns arrived on the Western Front in November 1916 and by the end of 1916 it equipped 10 sections out of a total of 91. An AA section consisted of two guns and became the standard organizational unit.

By the end of World War I, 257 (out of a total of 402 AA guns) were in land service in England on static and lorry mountings, and 102 (out of a total of 348) were in service on the Western Front mounted on heavy lorries, typically the Peerless 4 Ton. In addition, many were mounted on Royal Navy ships.

Performance

World War II
At the beginning of World War II in 1939, Britain possessed approximately 500 of these guns. Initially most were in the heavy anti-aircraft (HAA) role until replaced by the new QF  gun. Some were deployed as light anti-aircraft guns (LAA) for airfield defence, being transferred to the RAF Regiment when this was formed in 1942, until more 40 mm Bofors guns arrived However, it was discovered at mobilization that the 233 guns in HAA reserve were missing various parts and predicted fire instruments. One hundred and twenty were in France with the British Expeditionary Force in November 1939, compared with 48 of the modern QF 3.7-inch AA gun.

In 1941, 100 of the obsolete guns were converted to become the 3-inch 16 cwt anti-tank gun, firing a  armour-piercing shell. They appear to have been mainly deployed in home defence. Some were mounted to Churchill tanks to become the "Gun Carrier, 3-inch, Mk I, Churchill (A22D)".

Naval gun
In World War II the gun was carried by S-class, U-class and V-class submarines.

It was also fitted to older destroyers, A-class to I class during refits in 1940, replacing a set of torpedo tubes, to increase their AA capabilities. Some smaller warships used this gun as well. In 1939 it was estimated the RN had 553 Mk I, 184 Mk II, 27 Mk III and 111 Mk IV guns in service.

Finnish use
Britain supplied 24 Mk 3 guns and 7 M/34 mechanical fire control computers to Finland during the Winter War of 30 November 1939 to March 1940 but they arrived too late to be used. They were used during the Continuation War of 1941–1944.

World War I ammunition

World War II ammunition

See also 
List of anti-aircraft guns
List of naval anti-aircraft guns

Weapons of comparable role, performance and era
 Japanese type 88 75 mm AA gun
 United States 3-inch gun M1918

Surviving examples

At the Royal Artillery Museum, London
A gun at Pendennis Castle, Cornwall, UK, now displayed at Dover Castle, Kent, UK
A gun captured by Israel from Egypt in the 1956 war, missing breech screw, is displayed at the Clandestine Immigration and Naval Museum, Haifa, Israel.
A gun from the Egyptian ship "El Amir Faruk", sunk in 1948, missing the elevation mechanism, is displayed at the Clandestine Immigration and Naval Museum, Haifa, Israel.
Mk 3 gun is displayed at the Ilmatorjuntamuseo, Tuusula, Finland.
Mk III at Oulu garrison, Intiö district of Oulu, Finland
A restored gun at Dover Castle, Kent, UK. During the summer months, weekly demonstration firings take place.

References

Bibliography
.

External links

 Gun drill for 3-inch (20 cwt) L.F. A.A. gun marks I and III on (a) motor lorry mounting (b) fixed mounting or travelling platform 1923 at State Library of Victoria
British 12-pdr (3"/45 (76.2 cm)) 20cwt QF HA Marks I, II, III and IV

World War I artillery of the United Kingdom
World War II artillery of the United Kingdom
World War I anti-aircraft guns
World War II anti-aircraft guns
Naval anti-aircraft guns
Vickers
76 mm artillery
World War I naval weapons of the United Kingdom
World War II naval weapons of the United Kingdom